Reishia luteostoma is a species of sea snail, a marine gastropod mollusk, in the family Muricidae, the murex snails or rock snails.

Description
The shell size varies between 40 mm and 66 mm

Distribution
This species occurs in the Pacific Ocean off Japan; also off Malaysia.

References

In: Eydoux J. F. T. & Souleyet F. L. A. 1841-1852, Voyage autour du Monde executé pendant les années 1836 et 1837 sur la corvette "La Bonite", commandée par M. Vaillant, Capitaine de vaisseau, publié par ordre du Roi sous les auspices du Département de la Marine., p. 664 pp
 Eydoux, J. F. T. & Souleyet, L. F. A. (1852). Voyage autour du monde exécuté pendant les années 1836 et 1837 sur la corvette La Bonite commandée par M. Vaillant. Zoologie, Tome Deuxième. Zoologie. Bertrand, Paris. 664 pp., Paris (Arthus Bertrand).
 Blackmore, G. (1998). The importance of feeding ecology in investigating accumulated heavy metal body burdens in Thais clavigera (Kuster) (mollusca: neogastropoda: muricidae) in Hong Kong. PhD thesis. The University of Hong Kong. 
 Claremont, M., Vermeij, G. J., Williams, S. T. & Reid, D. G. (2013). Global phylogeny and new classification of the Rapaninae (Gastropoda: Muricidae), dominant molluscan predators on tropical rocky seashores. Molecular Phylogenetics and Evolution. 66: 91–102.

External links
 
 Holten, H. S. 1802. Enumeratio systematica conchyliorum beat J. H. Chemnitzii quondam ecclesiae Zebaothi Havniae pastoris, plurim societum sodialis p. p. quae publica auctione venduntur die 7me Decembris ano pres. Copenhagen: K. H. Scidelini. vi + 88 pp.
 Dunker, W. (1860). Neue japanische Mollusken. Malakozoologische Blätter. 6: 221-240
 Eydoux, J. F. T. & Souleyet, L. F. A. (1852). Voyage autour du monde exécuté pendant les années 1836 et 1837 sur la corvette La Bonite commandée par M. Vaillant. Zoologie, Tome Deuxième. Zoologie. Bertrand, Paris. 664 pp., Paris (Arthus Bertrand).
 

luteostoma
Gastropods described in 1803